Bonytt is a Norwegian monthly home and interior design magazine based in Oslo, Norway. Founded in 1941, it is one of the oldest magazines in the country as well as the most popular magazine in its category.

History and profile
Bonytt was established by Arne Remlow and Per Tannum in 1941. Ramlow was the owner and long-term editor-in-chief of the magazine, which has its headquarters in Oslo. In 1947 the magazine become the official media outlet of the Norwegian Applied Art Association. In the 1950s it adopted a modernist approach, which was left later. Then it positioned itself as a source for inspiration for the amateur interior designers. In 1967 the magazine was renamed as Nye Bonytt to indicate its new approach.

The magazine is part of Egmont/Orkla ASA. It is published monthly by Egmont Hjemmet Mortensen A/S. In 2010 an IPad version of Bonytt was started.

In 1999 Bonytt sold 711,000 copies, making it the best-selling consumer special interest magazine in Norway. The circulation of the magazine was 68,000 copies in 2003. In 2006 the magazine sold 62,900 copies.

References

1941 establishments in Norway
Design magazines
Magazines established in 1941
Magazines published in Oslo
Monthly magazines published in Norway
Norwegian-language magazines